Tupavirus is a genus of viruses in the family Rhabdoviridae, order Mononegavirales.

Taxonomy
The genus contains the following species:
 Durham tupavirus
 Klamath tupavirus
 Tupaia tupavirus

Structure
Tupavirions enveloped, with bullet shaped geometries. These particles are about 160 nm long. Tupavirus genomes are linear, around 11.2 kb in length. The genome codes for 7 proteins.

Life cycle
Viral replication is cytoplasmic. Entry into the host cell is achieved by attachment of the viral G glycoproteins to host receptors, which mediates clathrin-mediated endocytosis. Replication follows the negative stranded RNA virus replication model. Negative stranded RNA virus transcription, using polymerase stuttering is the method of transcription. The virus exits the host cell by budding, and  tubule-guided viral movement. Birds serve as the natural host for Durham tupavirus, with antibodies having been found in the American coot (Fulica americana). Additionally, antibodies for Klamath tupavirus have been found in several species of deer, bison, and humans, as well as voles and shrews.

References

External links
 Viralzone: Tupavirus
 ICTV

Rhabdoviridae
Virus genera